Sun Chips is a brand of fried grains, rippled, multigrain chips launched in 1991 and produced by Frito-Lay.

Flavors
Permanent flavors include Original, Harvest Cheddar, French Onion, Chili Lime, Garden Salsa, and Sweet & Spicy BBQ. In 2016, two Veggie Harvest flavors were added, Farmhouse Ranch and Tomato, Basil and Cheese that include vegetables. Limited edition flavors have included Cinnamon Crunch early in 2007 (the flavor is still produced as a seasonal item in the US, reappearing near the end of the year for the holidays), as well as Honey Graham and Apple 'n Caramel in 2009.

Internationally, other flavors have been introduced such as bulgogi in South Korea.

Pork enzymes
In the past, some Frito-Lay brand seasoned products, including some flavors of Sun Chips, contained pork enzymes in addition to herbs, cheese, and other seasonings. Frito-Lay's web site states that they use enzymes from pigs (porcine enzymes) in some of their seasoned snack products to develop "unique flavors". The presence of pig-derived ingredients made them haram (forbidden) for Muslims, not kosher for Jews, and not vegetarian. As of April 5, 2011, Frito-Lay's online list "U.S. Products Made Without Pig (Porcine) Enzymes" catalogs nine flavors of Sun Chips "made and distributed in the U.S." that do not contain porcine enzymes.

Compostable bags
In April 2008, Frito Lay introduced compostable packaging for the SunChips product line. The bag is made of plant-based material. It will break down within 14 weeks in a hot, active compost pile.

Noise complaints
In October 2010, Frito-Lay stated that the compostable package would be pulled back in the United States. The bag created excessive noise when held or wrinkled, which led to complaints.  In response to various complaints, Frito Lay announced that they would only use the compostable bag for original flavor chips from the SunChips US line moving forward. The other US flavors will use traditional SunChips packaging.

Second attempt
On February 24, 2011, Frito Lay announced that they were releasing a new, quieter biodegradable bag starting with the Original Sun Chip brand.
Closely resembling traditional bags, the compostable packaging uses adhesives sandwiched between the outer and inner layers of the bag to substantially reduce the excessive noise. Current bags are not labeled as compostable, .

Popularity
Parent corporation PepsiCo reported that sales of SunChips have declined by double-digit percentages annually from 2011-2014.

References

External links

 

Brand name snack foods
Frito-Lay brands
Products introduced in 1991